Debbie Janice Dupuis is a Canadian statistician who works in decision science and robust statistics with applications to statistical finance and environmental statistics. She is a professor in the Department of Decision Sciences at HEC Montréal.

Education and career
Dupuis grew up in Memramcook, New Brunswick, and graduated from the Université de Moncton in 1989 with a bachelor's degree in mathematics and a minor in computer science. With the support of an NSERC graduate fellowship, she earned a master's degree in mathematics and statistics from Queen's University. She completed her Ph.D. in 1994 from the University of New Brunswick. Her dissertation, Knots in Spline Regression: Estimation and Inference Using Laplace Transform Techniques, was supervised by Roman Mureika, and won the Governor General's Gold Medal. She was a faculty member at Dalhousie University and Western University before moving to HEC Montréal.

Recognition
In 2012 the Université de Moncton gave Dupuis their Le Prisme award as a distinguished alumna in the sciences. In 2017 Dupuis was elected as a Fellow of the American Statistical Association "for outstanding contributions to the analysis of extreme values and the development of robust statistical methods; for designing and promoting the use of innovative statistical analysis techniques in a broad array of substantive fields, most notably the environmental sciences, finance and hydrology; and for dynamic and sustained involvement in editorial and organizational service to the profession".

References

External links
Home page

Year of birth missing (living people)
Living people
Canadian statisticians
Women statisticians
Université de Moncton alumni
Queen's University at Kingston alumni
University of New Brunswick alumni
Academic staff of the Dalhousie University
Academic staff of the University of Western Ontario
Fellows of the American Statistical Association